Nam Jeong-im (July 21, 1945 – September 2, 1992)  was a South Korean actress. Nam was commonly referred to as one of the "Troika" along with her rival actresses, Yoon Jeong-hee and Moon Hee of the 1960s and early 1970s.

Filmography
*Note; the whole list is referenced.

Awards
*Note; the whole list is referenced.
 1966, the 4th Blue Dragon Film Awards : Special Award for New Actress
 1967, the 3rd Baeksang Arts Awards  : New Film Actress
 1967, the 5th Blue Dragon Film Awards : Favorite Actress
 1969, the 6th Blue Dragon Film Awards : Best Actress
 1967, the 6th Blue Dragon Film Awards : Favorite Actress
 1970, the 7th Blue Dragon Film Awards : Favorite Actress

References

External links 

1945 births
1992 deaths
20th-century South Korean actresses